Over 90 species and subspecies of Plasmodium infect lizards. They have been reported from over 3200 species of lizard but only 29 species of snake. Three species - P. pessoai, P. tomodoni and P. wenyoni - infect snakes. These species belong to the subgenera Asiamoeba, Carinamoeba, Fallisia, Garnia, Lacertamoeba, Ophidiella, Paraplasmodium and Sauramoeba. Additional species continue to be described.

Host records 

P. agamae - the rainbow lizard (Agama agama)
P. attenuatum - Ameiva ameiva
P. arachniformis - chameleons
P. aurulentum - neotropical forest gecko (Thecadactylus rapicaudus)
P. azurophilum - anole lizards (Anolis gingivinus, Anolis gundlachi, Anolis sabanus)
P. bailli - Anolis lizards (Anolis limifrons, Anolis lionotus and Anolis poecilopus)
P. basilisci - the striped basilisk (Basiliscus vittatus)
P. beebei - the gecko (Gonatodes taniae)
P. brygooi - short-horned chameleon (Chamaeleo brevicornis)
P. chiricahuae - fence lizard (Sceloporus jarrovi)
P. circularis - Australian skink (Egernia stokesii)
P. cnemaspi - African gecko (Cnemaspis africana)
P. cnemidophori - Ameiva ameiva
P. colombiense - Anolis lizard (Anolis auratus)
P. diploglossi - Anguid lizard (Diploglossus fasciatus)
P. draconis - the flying lizard (Draco volans)
P. egerniae - the land mullet (Egernia major)
P. fairchildi - Anolis lizard (Anolis cupreus)
P. floridense - anole lizards (Anolis biporcatus, Anolis carolinensis, Anolis frenatus, Anolis gingivinus, Anolis gundlachi, Anolis limifrons, Anolis pentaprion, Anolis sabanus and Anolis sagrei)
P. giganteum - the rainbow lizard (Agama agama), the African tropical lizard (Agama cyanogaster)
P. gologoense - chameleons
P. gracilis - skink (Tribolonotus gracilis)
P. guyannense - the iguanid lizard (Plica plica)
P. heischi - skinks (Mabuya striata)
P. hispaniolae - Anolis lizards 
P. holaspi - African flying lizard (Holaspis guentheri)
P. iguanae - Iguana iguana iguana
P. kentropyxi - teiid lizard (Kentropyx calcarata)
P. lacertiliae - crocodile skink (Tribolonotus species)
P. lainsoni - the gecko (Phyllodactylus ventralis)
P. lepidoptiformis - teiid lizard (Kentropyx calcarata)
P. lionatum - the flying gecko (Ptychozoon lionatum)
P. loveridgei - African gecko (Lygodactylus picturatus)
P. lygosomae - skink (Lygosoma moco)
P. mabuiae - African skink (Mabuya quinquetaeiata)
P. mackerrasae - Australian skinks (Egernia cunninghami, Egernia stokesii and Egernia striolata)
P. maculilabre - African skink (Mabuya species)
P. marginatum - Anolis lizard (Anolis frenatus)
P. mexicanum - fence lizards (Sceloporus occidentalis)
P. michikoa - chameleons
P. minasense - African skink (Mabuya agilis)
P. minasense anolisi - Anolis lizards (Anolis cybotes, Anolis distichus, Anolis frenatus and Anolis limifrons)
P. minasense calcaratae - teiid lizard (Kentropyx calcarata)
P. minasense capitoi - Anolis lizard (Anolis capito)
P. minasense carinii - iguanid lizard (Iguana iguana)
P. minasense diminutivum - dwarf tegu lizard (Ameiva ameiva)
P. minasense minasense - African skink (Mabuya mabouya)
P. minasense plicae - olive tree runner lizard (Plica umbra)
P. minasense tegui - blue tengu lizard (Tupinambis teguixin)
P. pelaezi - the iguanid lizard (Urosaurus bicarinatus bicarinatus)
P. pessoai - snakes (Spilotes pullatus and Lachesis muta)
P. pifanoi - the green ameiva lizard (Ameiva ameiva) and a teiid lizard (Kentropyx calcarata)
P. pitmani - African skink (Mabuya species)
P. rhadinurum - Iguana iguana iguana
P. robinsoni - the Parson's Chameleon (Chamaelo parsoni crucifer)
P. sasai - Japanese lacertids (Takydromus tachydromoides and Takydromus smaragdinus)
P. saurocaudatum - the many-lined sun skink (Mabuya multifasciata)
P. scorzai - the gecko Phyllodactylus ventralis
P. siamense - lizards.
P. tanzaniae - chameleons
P. tomodoni - snakes
P. torrealbai - Anolis lizards
P. tribolonoti - skinks (Tribolonotus gracilis)
P. tropiduri - iguanid lizard (Tropidurus torquatus), Anolis lizards (Anolis biporcatus, Anolis cybotes, Anolis frenatus, Anolis limifrons, Anolis lionotus, Anolis pentaprion and Anolis poecilopus), teiid lizard (Kentropyx calcarata)
P. tropiduri aquaticum - Anolis lizards (Anolis lionotus and Anolis poecilopus)
P. tropiduri panamense - Anolis lizard (Anolis biporcatus)
P. tropiduri tropiduri - Tropidurus hispidus
P. robinsoni - the red-headed rock agama lizard (Agama agama)
P. uluguruense - African gecko (Hemidactylus platycephalus)
P. uzungwiense - chameleons
P. vacuolatum - the rainforest lizard (Plica umbra)
P. vastator - the flying lizard (Draco volans)
P. volans - the flying lizard (Draco volans)
P. wenyoni - snakes

Subspecies 

P. fairchildi - P. fairchildi fairchildi and P. fairchildi hispaniolae
P. lygosomae - P. lygosomae nucleoversans and P. lygosomae nucleoversans
P. minasense - P. minasense anolisi, P. minasense capitoi, P. minasense carinii,
P. minasense diminutivum, P. minasense minasense, P. minasense plicae, and P. minasense tegui. An additional subspecies P. minasense calcaratae has also been described.
P. traguli - P. traguli traguli and P. traguli memmina.
P. tropiduri - P. tropiduri aquaticum, P. tropiduri panamense and P. tropiduri tropiduri.

Vectors 

Compared with those known for the species infecting humans, few vectors are known for these species.
 
P. agamae - Lutzomyia or Culicoides species
	 
Culex:
	 
Culex fatigans - P. rhadinurum
	 
Aedes:
	 
Aedes aegypti - P. rhadinurum

Interrelatedness 

P. floridense is closely related to P. tropiduri and P. minasense

References 

 List of Plasmodium species infecting reptiles